Black Horse Butte Creek is a stream in the U.S. state of South Dakota.

The stream was named after nearby Black Horse Butte.

See also
List of rivers of South Dakota

References

Rivers of Corson County, South Dakota
Rivers of Perkins County, South Dakota
Rivers of South Dakota